Things Behind the Sun is a 2001 drama film directed by Allison Anders and starring Kim Dickens and Gabriel Mann. It premiered at the 2001 Sundance Film Festival and was later aired on television by Showtime on August 18, 2001. The film is based on an early adolescent experience of Anders’. Its title is taken from a song by Nick Drake.

The film was honored with the Peabody Award in 2002.

Plot
Owen, a young reporter for a Los Angeles-based music magazine, returns to his Florida hometown to interview Sherry, a local rock singer. Sherry and her band are becoming increasingly popular, largely because of a song she wrote about being raped as a girl; this song has become a hit on college radio. Owen's reasons for returning to his hometown are more than professional, however: he and Sherry were close friends in childhood. He is also aware of the identity of her rapists, as the ringleader was his brother Dan. Through flashbacks, Owen recalls his complicity in the gang-rapes that his brother Dan and his friends perpetrated on many girls. Whenever he would hear someone being forced into Dan's room, which was adjacent to his own, he would block out the noise with music.

It is later revealed that Sherry had come to Owen's house on the day of her rape to give him a mixtape. Owen resorted to his usual tactic of trying to ignore what was happening, but he was dragged out of his room and forced to participate in her gang-rape. He tells Sherry that he didn't even know it was her until it was over.

Owen informs his brother Dan that he sent the details of Sherry's rape, including his own role in the crime, to Dan's parole officer and to his own editor. Owen also informs him that he has found some of the twelve girls who were raped, and they are willing to testify against Dan to the parole board. Dan will never be able to leave prison. When Dan vehemently asks why Owen is doing this, Owen replies that he loved Sherry.

Cast

Production 
Anders based the film on her own experience as a young girl. Anders said she had tried to deal with her rape at age twelve "in therapy, through acting out sexually, through self-medication … by every means possible, but I still was in a dark place." The film was shot on digital video. This is Anders' third film to center on music industry figures, after Grace of My Heart and Sugar Town.

Music 
Rock band Sonic Youth provided the film's score. Several hits from 1960s band The Left Banke are also featured. Kristen Vigard provided Kim Dickens' singing voice.

Reception

Release 
The film premiered January 24, 2001 at the Sundance Film Festival. It was also screened at the Los Angeles Film Festival on April 28, 2001 and at the Karlovy Vary Film Festival on July 7, 2001. Though Anders got an offer for theatrical distribution, the film was released on Showtime. Of its TV airing, Anders said the advantage would be "millions of people will see [the] movie as opposed to what you’ll usually get on an indie theatrical release."

Critical reception 
On review aggregator website Rotten Tomatoes, Things Behind the Sun has a 100% approval rating, with an average rating of 7.10/10 based on 12 reviews.

Critics praised Anders' unsentimental, understated approach to her subject and the film's performances. David Rooney of Variety wrote, "Playing a character prone to drinking binges and out-of-control behavior, [Kim Dickens] nonetheless conveys the woman’s pain, anger and tragic vulnerability in quietly measured terms that make her performance all the more affecting." In The A.V. Club, Nathan Rabin wrote Don Cheadle "invests the seemingly thankless role of Dickens' manager, protector, and long-suffering semi-boyfriend with pathos and gravity."

Rooney added, "Anders’ primary theme is the need to return to the past and unearth suppressed memories in order for healing to begin. While this is standard movie-of-the-week fodder, the raw treatment and controlled intensity here set it apart, as does the extension of the film’s gaze beyond the rape victim." In a positive review, critic Emanuel Levy wrote "the duality of P.O.V., showing the rape and its ruinous consequences from [various points of view]...endows the film with a unique angle seldom seen before." Writing for FilmCritic.com, Rachel Gordon said the film "adheres to a perspective important for both men and women to see," and that "what sets Things Behind the Sun apart from such [films such as The Accused] is that it takes these stories one step further, to the severe aftermath of living with these memories years later."

The film's music was also praised, with Rooney noting "the songs here serve to show the powerful effect music can have on people, as comfort, release, therapy, memory, escape or as a point of connection." Some criticisms of the film were of the ending, with some saying it wraps things up too tidily, as well as of the dialogue. Jonathan Foreman of the New York Post said these flaws were minor, however, and wrote, it's "rawly personal, and in the way it confronts the sexual aftershocks of the crime – on both victim and perpetrator – it’s a film of remarkable honesty and courage."

Awards and nominations
The film won the Peabody Award in 2002 for its exploration of trauma. It was also nominated for an Independent Spirit Award for Best Feature, as well as Best Female Lead for Kim Dickens. Don Cheadle was nominated for an Independent Spirit Award for Best Supporting Male and an Emmy Award for Outstanding Supporting Actor in a Miniseries or a Movie. The film was nominated for Best Television Feature or Miniseries at the Edgar Allan Poe Awards.

Home media 
Things Behind the Sun was released on DVD on April 8, 2003. It contained an audio commentary track from Anders, co-writer Kurt Voss, and producer Daniel Hassid.

References

External links

Things Behind the Sun at AllMovie

2001 films
Peabody Award-winning broadcasts
2001 drama films
Films directed by Allison Anders
2001 independent films
2000s English-language films
Films about singers
Films set in Florida
Films about rape
Films about post-traumatic stress disorder